Lê Thần Tông (黎神宗, 19 November 1607 – 2 November 1662) was the 17th emperor of Vietnamese Later Lê dynasty.

Biography
Lê Thần Tông's birth name is Lê Duy Kỳ (黎維祺). He was born in 1607 and reigned in 1619–1643 following Lê Kính Tông, was interrupted by the reign of Lê Chân Tông 1643–1649, then reigned again 1649–1662 and was succeeded by Lê Huyền Tông. He was a figurehead emperor with lords Trịnh Tùng, who ruled 1570–1623, then Trịnh Tráng who ruled in 1623–1657, and Trịnh Tạc who ruled 1657–1682. At this time the Tonkin was still engaged in military campaigns against Nguyễn Lords in the south.

Family
Consorts and their respective issues :

 Empress consort Trịnh Thị Ngọc Trúc (ex-wife of duke Lê Trụ)
 Noble consort Nguyễn Thị Ngọc Bạch
 Prince Lê Duy Hựu
 Consort Phạm Thị Ngọc Hậu
 First crown prince Lê Duy Vũ
 Consort Lê Thị Ngọc Hoàn
 Prince Lê Duy Cối
 Lady Nguyễn Thị Ngọc Tấn
 Prince Lê Duy Hạp
 Lady Nguyễn Thị Nhân
 Princess Lê Thị Ngọc Thỉnh
 Lady Nguyễn Thị Sinh
 Princess Lê Thị Ngọc Hài
 Lady Nguyễn Thị Vĩ
 Princess Lê Thị Ngọc Điều
 Lady Trịnh Thị
 Princess Lê Thị Ngọc Triện 
 Lady Trần Thị Lãng
 Princess Lê Thị Ngọc An
 Lady Onrona San (Dutch Korean woman)
 Princess Lê Thị Ngọc Ngọc

Moreover, 4 foster children : Princess Lê Thị Ngọc Duyên, second crown prince Lê Duy Tào, prince Lê Duy Lương and Các Hắc Sinh. Inside, Các Hắc Sinh or Willem Carel Hartsinck (1638 - 1689) was the Dutch tradesman who deputized the Dutch East India Company in Far East.

References

1607 births
1662 deaths
17th-century Vietnamese monarchs
T
Vietnamese retired emperors
Vietnamese monarchs